Griffith Airport  is an airport serving Griffith, New South Wales, Australia.

Facilities 

Airlines and destinations 

Sharp Airlines formerly ran services to Melbourne, which ceased in March 2022. The route was also previously operated by Rex Airlines, which ceased in July 2012.

Statistics 
Griffith Airport was ranked 45th in Australia for the number of revenue passengers served in calendar year 2018.

See also 
 List of the busiest airports in Australia
 List of airports in New South Wales

References

External links 
 Griffith City Council airport page
 

Airports in New South Wales
Griffith, New South Wales